The Los Angeles Dodgers are a Major League Baseball (MLB) franchise based in Los Angeles. They play in the National League West division. The first game of the new baseball season for a team is played on Opening Day, and being named the Opening Day starter is an honor, which is often given to the player who is expected to lead the pitching staff that season, though there are various strategic reasons why a team's best pitcher might not start on Opening Day. The Dodgers have used 24 different Opening Day starting pitchers in their 65 seasons in Los Angeles. The 24 starters have a combined Opening Day record of 28 wins, 27 losses and 9 no decisions.

The Dodgers started playing in Los Angeles in 1958, after moving from Brooklyn.  The first Opening Day game for the Dodgers in Los Angeles was played in San Francisco against the San Francisco Giants on April 15, 1958.  California native Don Drysdale was the Dodgers' Opening Day starting pitcher that day, in a game the Dodgers lost 8–0.  Dodgers starting pitchers won both of their Opening Day starts in their first home ballpark in Los Angeles, Los Angeles Memorial Coliseum.

Clayton Kershaw's nine Opening Day starts for the Dodgers from 2011 to 2018 and 2021 are the most ever by a Dodgers starter, two more than Don Drysdale and Don Sutton.  Fernando Valenzuela, Ramón Martínez and Orel Hershiser have had at least four Opening Day starts, with six, five and four respectively.  Hall of Famer Sandy Koufax, who won three Cy Young Awards during the 1960s, only made one Opening Day start for the Dodgers, in 1964.  Drysdale and Kershaw are also tied  for the Los Angeles Dodgers record for most wins as an Opening Day starter, with five wins. They both also have two losses.

Koufax (1964), Chan Ho Park (2001), Brad Penny (2008) and Hiroki Kuroda (2009) are the only Los Angeles Dodgers Opening Day starting pitchers to have won all their Opening Day decisions, Martinez and Derek Lowe share the Los Angeles Dodgers record for most Opening Day losses, with three.  The Los Angeles Dodgers won the World Series championship in 1959, 1963, 1965, 1981, 1988 and 2020.  Drysdale (1959, 1963 and 1965), Fernando Valenzuela (1981 and 1988) and Dustin May (2020) were the Dodgers' Opening Day starting pitchers those years.  The Dodgers' starting pitcher won the Opening Day game in 1963, 1965 and 1981, but lost in 1959 and 1988. In 2020 the starter did not factor in the decision.

Key

Pitchers

References

General

Specific

Opening day starters
Lists of Major League Baseball Opening Day starting pitchers
Dodgers